Lulunta is a district of the Maipú Department in the Mendoza Province, on the western side of Argentina. It is located about 20 minutes from Mendoza City.

The town is home to many wineries and vineyards.

See also
Mendoza wine

External links
 Lulunta description in Los Andes
Brief description about Lulunta's wines

Populated places in Mendoza Province